The 1944–45 Challenge Cup was the 44th staging of rugby league's oldest knockout competition, the Challenge Cup.

Qualifier

First round

Second round

Semifinals

Final
In the final of the Rugby league Challenge Cup, Huddersfield beat Bradford Northern 13-9 on aggregate over two legs in front of an aggregate crowd of 26,541.

References

Challenge Cup
Challenge Cup